Helosciadium is a genus of flowering plants belonging to the family Apiaceae.

Its native range is Europe to Central Asia and Pakistan, Macaronesia to Arabian Peninsula And Tanzania.

, Plants of the World Online accepted the following species and hybrids:

Helosciadium bermejoi 
Helosciadium crassipes 
Helosciadium inundatum 
Helosciadium × longipedunculatum 
Helosciadium milfontinum 
Helosciadium × moorei 
Helosciadium nodiflorum 
Helosciadium repens

References

Apioideae
Apioideae genera